Anilai and Asinai (חנילאי וחסינאי; "Hanilai and Hasinai") were two Babylonian-Jewish robber chieftains of the Parthian Empire whose exploits were reported by Josephus.

They were apprenticed by their widowed mother to a weaver. Having been punished for laziness by their master, they ran away and became freebooters in the marshlands of the Euphrates. There they gathered about them a large number of discontented Jews, organizing troops, and levying forced contributions on the shepherds, and finally established a little robber-state at the forks of the Euphrates.

One Sabbath they were surprised by the Parthian ruler of Babylonia, but they determined to fight regardless of the day of rest, and defeated their assailant so completely that the Parthian king Artabanus III (10-40 CE), who was just then engaged in putting down a rebellion, resolved to make use of such brave Jews to keep the satraps in check. He concluded an alliance with them, entrusting them with the control of that portion of Babylonia which they already occupied.

They then built fortifications, and the little state lasted for fifteen years (c. 18–33). Its downfall was brought about by the marriage of Anilai with the widow of a Parthian general, whom he had attacked and killed in battle. He tolerated the religion of his foreign wife, and met the religious intolerance of his people with rigor, thus estranging some of his followers and sowing dissension among them.

After Asinai had been poisoned by his brother's wife for his intolerant utterances, Anilai assumed the leadership of his troops. He sought to divert them with wars, and succeeded in capturing Mithridates, governor of Parthyene, and son-in-law of the king. He soon, however, released Mithridates, fearing that Artaban might take vengeance on the Babylonian Jews for his death. Being signally defeated by Mithridates in a subsequent engagement, he was forced to withdraw to the forests, where he lived by plundering the Babylonian villages about Nehardea, until his resources were exhausted and the little robber-state disappeared.

Babylonians' discontent with the Jews, so far restrained because of their fear of Anilai, now broke forth afresh, causing the Jews to flee from the persecutions to Seleucia, yet without finding the desired peace in the exile, either.

The name Anilai is identical with "Ḥanilai" in Talmudic literature. This was, for example, the name of the father of the well-known haggadist Tanḥum b. Ḥamilas (Bacher, Ag. Pal. Amor. iii.627).

Sources
Josephus, Antiquities, xviii.9.

References

Jewish Babylonian history
Iraqi Jews
People from the Parthian Empire
Ancient criminals
1st-century Jews
1st-century Iranian people